Big Brother 2011 was the fifth season of the Swedish version of the reality show Big Brother. It was premièred on 20 February 2011, when 17 housemates were locked inside a house located in Årsta Partihallar outside Stockholm TV11 broadcasts program six nights a week. Highlights shows are broadcast from Monday to Friday 22:00-23:00. Weekly Finals are broadcast on Sunday 21:00-22:25. For a fee, the viewer could also follow the participants live on the Internet. Overall, participants were locked up for 106 days (15 weeks). On 26 January 2011, it was announced that Gry Forssell would be the host of the show.

The winner of the fifth Swedish Big Brother series receives a grand prize of 500,000 SEK.

Format
Housemates are incarcerated in the Big Brother House with no contact to and from the outside world. Each week participants competed in various challenges, which they had to perform to make Big Brother satisfied.  Housemates were instructed to nominate two fellow housemates for eviction each week.  This compulsory vote was conducted in the privacy of "Bikten" (the Confession) and housemates were not allowed to discuss the nomination process or influence the nominations of others. The two that received the most nominations, viewers decided who they wanted to save, the housemate with the fewest votes was evicted. If one or more participants violated the Big Brother rules the week they were also up for the weekly eviction.

Housemates 

During the season, either the viewers or the housemates will have the chance to vote in wild cards to the Big Brother house.

The Glass House
Between 19 February to 27 four so-called "Wild cards" competed in to be a housemate in the new Big Brother house. They were all staying in "the Glass House", located in Skärholmens centrum. Of the four who were in the house, viewers vote for two, a boy and a girl, who will be moving into the real Big Brother house, where they would become leaders in the house. The Glass House could only be followed by the program's website but was free to look at. The "wild cards" were (those marked in bold went in the real house):
Jimmy Guliano, 30 år, Malmö
Gökhan "Gurkan" Gasi, 26 år, Västerås
Roza Kahi, 22 år, Kista
Sophie Palmstierna, 26 år, Malmö

Hunk Eden
Henrik Ström, Martin Isberg, and Patrik Edvardsson were introduced one week after the show started. In the first weekly live show, it was announced that the viewers got the chance to again vote in one participant in the Big Brother house. The three guys, called "the hunks", went to Thailand taking on various challenges in hopes of winning the viewers' vote. Every day, they received a new assignment. For a few days before Day 15, you were also able to follow them all the time inside a part of the Big Brother house. These days, they were trained by Drill Sergeant Jimmy Guliano. On Day 15, Patrik Edvardsson was voted in by the public with 41.64% of 21,434 votes to become a new housemate.

The Oasis
On week 5, three girls, Marisol Egana, Madelene Stigsjöö, and Minela Grebenarevic moved into the Mission Room, now called The Oasis. The guys in the house decided which one of the three would move into the house. According to the Big Brother presenter, Gry Forsell, the winner of this mission would take the very last place in the house. On Day 33 the guys picked Madelene to be the new housemate.

Nominations table
First nomination with 2 points and the second nomination with 1 point.

Rodney was evicted with 28.19% and 6.289 votes. Madelene was saved with 6.290 votes and finally, Katerina was saved with the most votes (43.61% and 9.725 votes).

References

External links 
Bigbrother.se
Big Brother 2011 Archive
World of Big Brother

2011 Swedish television series debuts
5